Archibald Gracie Mansion (commonly called Gracie Mansion) is the official residence of the Mayor of New York City. Built in 1799, it is located in Carl Schurz Park, at East End Avenue and 88th Street in the Yorkville neighborhood of Manhattan. The mansion overlooks Hell Gate channel in the East River.

History

Before construction and early days

George Washington commandeered a different building on approximately the same site during the American Revolutionary War, as it strategically overlooked Hell Gate. That building, called Belview Mansion, was the country residence of Jacob Walton, a New York merchant. The British destroyed this house during that war.

Archibald Gracie then built another building, now known as Gracie Mansion, on the site in 1799, and used it as a country home until 1823, when he had to sell it to pay debts. In the fall of 1801, Gracie hosted a meeting there of New York Federalists, called by Alexander Hamilton, to raise $10,000 for starting the New York Evening Post newspaper, which eventually became the New York Post.

Later history
Other people lived in the house until 1896, when the municipal government seized it and made its grounds part of Carl Schurz Park. It served various functions as part of that park (at various times it housed public restrooms, an ice cream stand, and classrooms) until 1924. From 1924 until 1936, it housed the Museum of the City of New York, and from 1936 until 1942, it was shown as a historical house.

In 1942, Robert Moses convinced Mayor Fiorello H. La Guardia to appropriate the house as a mayoral residence. Its main two floors are open to the public on a limited basis for guided tours and serve as a small museum.

It was added to the National Register of Historic Places in 1975.

Recent use
The house may only be used for official city business. Only visiting public officials and the mayor's family may reside with the mayor at the mansion, even for a single overnight stay. This has prevented some recent mayors from living in the mansion; in 2001 Rudy Giuliani was forced to move out after he had been barred by a judge from bringing his then-girlfriend Judith Nathan to live with him in the mansion, a matter complicated by the fact that his estranged wife, Donna Hanover, refused to vacate the premises. 

Mayor Michael Bloomberg, likewise, never resided at Gracie Mansion, partially because regulations prevented him from moving in with his long-term partner, Diana Taylor, but also believing that the house should be left open to the public. However, he did use it for meetings and events; he also used the Mansion as a place for official visitors to stay while in the city. At the beginning of Bloomberg's term, he initiated a major restoration of the mansion, funded by an anonymous donor, suspected of being the billionaire mayor himself.

Mayor Eric Adams and his family currently live in the Gracie Mansion.

Architecture

Archibald Gracie built the two-story wooden mansion in the Federal style.  The design of the structure is attributed to Ezra Weeks, a prominent builder, or John McComb Jr., the architect of New York City Hall and Hamilton Grange, Alexander Hamilton's country home in Harlem, New York.

At the suggestion of Mayor Robert F. Wagner, Jr.'s wife, Susan, plans were prepared by architect Mott B. Schmidt for a new west wing. The annex, was dedicated on September 27, 1966 and is now known as the Susan B. Wagner wing. Criticized by some at the time for not being "modern," in style, the wing has come to be regarded by many as an appropriate solution to the problem of expanding the small house for official functions. The Gracie Mansion Conservancy restored portions of the building during 1981–1984, and further substantial decorative and functional restorations were made in 2002.

In popular culture
 The mansion and its surroundings play a prominent role in the novel Hell Gate (2010), by Linda Fairstein.
 The original footage from the TV show The Yule Log was filmed on 16 mm film at Gracie Mansion and shown from 1966 to 1969 on WPIX-TV.
 The Taking of Pelham One Two Three (1974 film) featured the house (exterior and interior) in several scenes.

See also
List of museums and cultural institutions in New York City

References
Notes

Further reading
 
 
 , Article that includes discussion of the caretaker of Gracie Mansion.

External links

Gracie Mansion Conservancy
 

Federal architecture in New York City
Government buildings on the National Register of Historic Places in Manhattan
Government of New York City
Gracie-King family
Historic house museums in New York City
Houses completed in 1799
Houses in Manhattan
Houses on the National Register of Historic Places in Manhattan
New York City Designated Landmarks in Manhattan
Local government buildings in the United States
Mayors' mansions in the United States
Museums in Manhattan
Yorkville, Manhattan
John McComb Jr. buildings